V90 may refer to:
 V.90, an ITU-T recommendation for data communication over the telephone network
 DB Class V 90 locomotive, a German road switcher diesel-hydraulic locomotive
 Hanlin eReader V90, an ebook reader
 Maxus V90, a light commercial van
 Vestas V90, a three-bladed upwind wind turbine generator series
 Volvo V90, a car